{{DISPLAYTITLE:C16H26N2O2}}
The molecular formula C26H16N2O2 may refer to:

 Dimethocaine, a local anesthetic
 Evenamide, a selective voltage-gated sodium channel blocker

Molecular formulas